Andhra Pradesh (abbr. AP) is a state in the south-eastern coastal region of India. It is bordered by Telangana to the north-west, Chhattisgarh to the north, Odisha to the north-east, Tamil Nadu to the south, Karnataka to the west and the Bay of Bengal to the east. Andhra State was the first state to be formed on a linguistic basis in India on 1 October 1953. On 1 November 1956, Andhra State was merged with the Telugu-speaking areas (ten districts) of the Hyderabad State to form United Andhra Pradesh. In 2014, these merged areas of Hyderabad State were bifurcated from United Andhra Pradesh to form the new state Telangana. The present form of Andhra is similar to Andhra state, but some mandalas like Bhadrachalam are still included in Telangana. Amaravati serves as the capital of present Andhra with the largest city being Visakhapatnam.

Andhra Pradesh was once a major Buddhist pilgrimage site in the country and a Buddhist learning center which can be seen in many sites in the state in the form of monastery ruins, chaityas, and stupas. It is also known for being the land of Koh-i-Noor and other globally known diamonds from Kollur Mine. It is also a major producer of rice known as the "Rice bowl of India". Its official language is Telugu; one of the classical languages of India, the fourth most spoken language in India, and the 13th-most spoken language in the world. Andhra Pradesh's second official language is Urdu.

Early inhabitants were known as the Andhras, tracing their history back to the Vedic period, when they were mentioned in the 8th century BCE Rigvedic text Aitareya Brahmana. According to the Aitareya Brahmana, the Andhras left North India from the banks of the Yamuna river and migrated to South India. The Assaka Mahajanapada (700–300 BCE) was an ancient kingdom located between the Godavari and Krishna rivers in southeastern India. Accounts that people in the region are descended from the Viswamitra are found in the Ramayana, the Mahabharata and the Puranas. The region also derives its name from the Satavahanas, who are also known as Andhras, the earliest kings of Andhra Pradesh and India.

People of the era supported local art and culture by building temples and sculptures of the Buddhist monuments in the state. It was ruled by the Mauryan Empire, Satavahana dynasty, Salankayanas, Andhra Ikshvakus, Pallavas, Vishnukundinas, Eastern Chalukyas, Rashtrakutas, Cholas, Kakatiyas, Vijayanagara Empire, Gajapati Empire, Mughal Empire, Deccan sultanates, Qutb Shahi dynasty, and Asaf Jahis. In the 3rd century BCE, Andhra was a vassal kingdom of Ashoka, but after his death Andhra became powerful and extended its empire to the whole of Maratha country and beyond.

Andhra Pradesh comprises three major regions namely Rayalaseema in the south-west, Coastal Andhra bordering the Bay of Bengal in the east and Uttarandhra at north-east. The state has 26 districts, 6 in Uttarandhra, 12 in Coastal Andhra and 8 in Rayalaseema. The state also borders a union territory, Yanam – a district of Puducherry, which lies to the south of Kakinada in the Godavari delta on the eastern side of the state. Andhra Pradesh ranks 27th among Indian states in Human Development Index (HDI). It has a jurisdiction over almost  of territorial waters.

Andhra Pradesh hosted 121.8 million visitors in 2015, a 30% growth in tourist arrivals over the previous year, making it the third most-visited state in India. The Tirumala Venkateswara Temple in Tirupati is one of the world's most visited religious sites, with 18.25 million visitors per year. The region is also home to a variety of other pilgrimage centres, such as the Pancharama Kshetras, Mallikarjuna Jyotirlinga and Kodanda Rama Temple. The state's natural attractions include the beaches of Visakhapatnam, hill stations such as the Araku Valley and Horsley Hills, and the deltas of Konaseema in the Godavari river, and Diviseema in the Krishna river.

History

Toponym 
A group of people named Andhras was mentioned in Sanskrit texts such as Aitareya Brahmana (800–500 BCE). According to Aitareya Brahmana of the Rig Veda, the Andhras left north India from banks of River Yamuna and settled in south India. The Satavahanas have been mentioned by the names Andhra, Andhrara-jateeya and Andhrabhrtya in the Puranic literature. They did not refer to themselves as Andhra in any of their coins or inscriptions; it is possible that they were termed as Andhras because of their ethnicity or because their territory included the Andhra region.

Early and medieval history 

The Assaka Mahajanapada, one of the sixteen Vedic Mahajanapadas, included Andhra, Maharashtra and Telangana. Archaeological evidence from places such as Amaravati, Dharanikota, and Vaddamanu suggests that the Andhra region was part of the Mauryan Empire. Amaravati might have been a regional centre for the Mauryan rule. After the death of Emperor Ashoka, Mauryan rule weakened around 200 BCE and was replaced by several smaller kingdoms in the Andhra region.

The Satavahana dynasty dominated the Deccan region from the 1st century BCE to the 3rd century CE. The later Satavahanas made Dharanikota and Amaravathi their capital, which according to the Buddhists is the place where Nagarjuna, the philosopher of Mahayana lived in the 2nd and 3rd centuries. The Andhra Ikshvakus, with their capital at Vijayapuri, succeeded the Satavahanas in the Krishna River valley in the latter half of the 2nd century. Pallavas, who were originally executive officers under the Satavahana kings, were not a recognised political power before the 2nd century CE and were swept away by the Western Chalukyan invasion, led by Pulakesin II in the first quarter of the 7th century CE. After the downfall of the Ikshvakus, the Vishnukundinas were the first great dynasty in the 5th and 6th centuries, and held sway over the entire Andhra country, including Kalinga and parts of Telangana. They played an important role in the history of Deccan during the 5th and 6th century CE, with Eluru, Amaravathi and Puranisangam.

The Salankayanas were an ancient dynasty that ruled the Andhra region between Godavari and Krishna with their capital at Vengi (modern Pedavegi) from 300 to 440 CE. The Eastern Chalukyas of Vengi, whose dynasty lasted for around five hundred years from the 7th century until 1130 CE, eventually merged with the Chola dynasty. They continued to rule under the protection of the Chola dynasty until 1189 CE when the kingdom succumbed to the Hoysalas and the Yadavas. The roots of the Telugu language have been seen on inscriptions found near the Guntur district and from others dating to the rule of Renati Cholas in the fifth century CE.

Kayastha chiefs descended from North Indian Kayasthas ruled over vast swathes of land in Andhra country, and they are recorded in Andhra history dating back to the 13th century CE. Kakatiyas ruled Andhra Pradesh state for nearly two hundred years and constructed several forts. They were succeeded by the Musunuri Nayaks. Musunuri Nayaks led a confederation of Nayakas to overthrow the rule of the Delhi Sultanate in Telugu lands.

The Reddi kingdom (1325–1448 CE) was established by Prolaya Vema Reddi in the early 14th century, who ruled from present day Kondaveedu. Prolaya Vema Reddi was part of the confederation of states that started a movement against the invading Turkic Muslim armies of the Delhi Sultanate. They constructed Kondaveedu Fort , which they ruled between 1328 and 1428, before it was taken over by the Gajpathis of Orissa, and later ravaged by the Muslim rulers of the Bahmani kingdom in 1458. The Vijayanagara emperor Krishnadevaraya captured it in 1516. The Golconda Sultans fought for the fort in 1531, 1536 and 1579, and Sultan Quli Qutb Shah captured it in 1579, renaming it Murtuzanagar. It was reconquered by Vijayanagara who overthrew sultanate rule across the entirety of modern-day Andhra Pradesh (excluding Telangana). After this rebellion, the Bahmani sultans launched no further military campaigns outside their kingdoms, because the Maratha empire soon emerged as the strongest power in India. Efforts are in progress to classify Kondaveedu Fort as a UNESCO World Heritage Site.

The Vijayanagara Empire originated in the Deccan Plateau region in the early 14th century. It was established in 1336 by Harihara Raya I and his brother Bukka Raya I of the Sangama Dynasty. The empire's patronage enabled fine arts and literature to reach new heights in Kannada, Telugu, Tamil, and Sanskrit, while Carnatic music evolved into its current form. During the Vijayanagara Empire, the Pemmasani Nayaks controlled parts of Andhra Pradesh and had large mercenary armies that were the vanguard of the Vijayanagara Empire in the sixteenth century. The Lepakshi group of monuments are culturally and archaeologically significant as it is the location of shrines dedicated to Shiva, Vishnu, and Veerabhadra which were built during the Vijayanagara Kings' period (1336–1646). The temples are the location of mural paintings of the Vijayanagara kings, Dravidian art, and inscriptions. Near the temple complex is a large granite Nandi bull. On a hillock known as Kurma Saila ('tortoise-shaped hill') are other temples to Papanatheswara, Raghunatha, Srirama, and Durga.

The Government of Andhra Pradesh has taken the initiative for including the "Lepakshi Group of Monuments" among the UNESCO World Heritage sites in India.

Modern history 

Harihara and Bukka, who served as treasury officers of the Kakatiyas of Warangal, founded the Vijayanagara Empire. In 1347 CE, an independent Muslim state, the Bahmani Sultanate, was established in south India by Ala-ud-Din Bahman Shah in a revolt against the Delhi Sultanate. The Qutb Shahi dynasty held sway over the Andhra country after the resolution of Vijayanagar empire by joint action of Mughals, Bijapur and Golconda sultanates.

In the early nineteenth century, Northern Circars was ceded to the British East India Company and became part of the Madras Presidency. Eventually, this region emerged as the Coastal Andhra region. Later the Nizam rulers of Hyderabad ceded five territories to the British that eventually became the Rayalaseema region. The Nizams retained control of the interior provinces as the princely state of Hyderabad, acknowledging British rule in return for local autonomy. However, Komaram Bheem, a tribal leader, started his fight against the erstwhile Asaf Jahi Dynasty for the liberation of Hyderabad State. Meanwhile, the French occupied Yanam, in the Godavari delta, and (save for periods of British control) would hold it until 1954. In 1947, Vizianagaram was the largest Hindu princely state in Andhra Pradesh.

In 1839 just before the British Raj, a cyclone struck Coringa, East Godavari district and toppled buildings, as a result 20,000 ships were destroyed and over 300,000 people were killed.

India became independent from the British Raj in 1947. The 7th Nizam wanted to retain the independence of the Princely Hyderabad State from India, but the people of the region launched a movement to join the Indian Union. The state of Hyderabad was integrated into the Indian Union with Operation Polo in 1948.

Post-independence 

In an effort to gain an independent state based on linguistic identity, and to protect the interests of the Telugu-speaking people of Madras State, Potti Sreeramulu fasted to death in 1952. As Madras became a bone of contention, in 1949 a JVP committee report stated: "Andhra Province could be formed provided the Andhras give up their claim on the city of Madras [now Chennai]". After Potti Sreeramulu's death, the Telugu-speaking area of Andhra State was carved out of Madras State on 1 October 1953, with Kurnool as its capital city. On the basis of the gentlemen's agreement of 1 November 1956, the States Reorganisation Act formed combined Andhra Pradesh by merging the Telugu-speaking areas of the already existing Hyderabad State. Hyderabad was made the capital of the new state. The Marathi-speaking areas of Hyderabad State merged with Bombay State and the Kannada-speaking areas were merged with Mysore State.

In February 2014, the Andhra Pradesh Reorganisation Act bill was passed by the Parliament of India for the formation of the Telangana state comprising ten districts. Hyderabad will remain as a joint capital for not exceeding ten years. The new state of Telangana came into existence on 2 June 2014 after approval from the President of India. Number of petitions questioning the validity of Andhra Pradesh Reorganisation Act, 2014 is long pending for the verdict since April 2014 before the Supreme Court constitutional bench.

In 2017, Government of Andhra Pradesh began operating from the newly planned capital city Amaravati. In August 2020, Andhra Pradesh Legislative Assembly passed Andhra Pradesh Decentralisation and Inclusive Development of All Regions Act, 2020. The decision resulted in widespread protests by the farmers of Amaravati. The act has been challenged in Andhra Pradesh High Court, which ordered to maintain status quo until the court completes its hearing. On 22 November 2021, the government, led by Y. S. Jagan Mohan Reddy, has withdrawn the act. The Chief Minister, however, said his government would bring a better and more complete bill. On 31 January 2023, it was announced that Visakhapatnam will become the new capital.

Geography 

The state has varied topography ranging from the hills of Eastern Ghats and Nallamala Hills to the shores of Bay of Bengal that support varied ecosystems, the rich diversity of flora and fauna. There are two main rivers namely, Krishna and Godavari, that flow through the state. The coastline of the state extends along the Bay of Bengal from Srikakulam to Nellore district with a length of 975 km (606 mi). The plains to the east of Eastern Ghats form the Eastern Coastal plains. The coastal plains are for the most part of delta regions formed by the Godavari, Krishna, and Penna rivers. The Eastern Ghats are discontinuous and individual sections have local names. The Eastern Ghats are a major dividing line in the state's geography. The Kadapa Basin formed by two arching branches of the Eastern Ghats is a mineral-rich area. The Ghats become more pronounced towards the south and extreme north of the coast. Most of the coastal plains are put to intense agricultural use. The Rayalaseema region has semi-arid conditions.

Natural vegetation and conservation 

The Andhra Pradesh Forest Department deals with protection, conservation and management of forests. The forest in the state can be broadly divided into four major biotic provinces. They are:
 Deccan Plateau
 Central Plateau
 Eastern Highland
 East Coastal Plains

Eastern Ghats region is home to dense tropical forests, while the vegetation becomes sparse as the Ghats give way to the Deccan Plateau, where shrub vegetation is more common. The vegetation found in the state is largely of dry deciduous types with a mixture of teak, Terminalia, Dalbergia, Pterocarpus, Anogeissus, etc.

The state has many sanctuaries, national parks and zoological parks, such as Coringa, Krishna Wildlife Sanctuary, Nagarjunsagar-Srisailam Tiger Reserve, Kambalakonda Wildlife Sanctuary, Sri Venkateswara Zoological Park and Indira Gandhi Zoological Park. Atapaka Bird Sanctuary, Nelapattu Bird Sanctuary, Telineelapuram and Telukunchi Bird Sanctuaries and Pulicat Lake Bird Sanctuary attract many migratory birds. The state possesses some rare and endemic plants like Cycas beddomei, Pterocarpus santalinus, Terminalia pallida, Syzygium alternifolium, Shorea talura, Shorea tumburgia, Psilotum nudum, etc. The diversity of fauna includes tigers, panthers, hyenas, black bucks, cheetals, sambars, sea turtles and a number of birds and reptiles. The estuaries of the Godavari and Krishna rivers support rich mangrove forests with fishing cats and otters as keystone species.

Climate 
The climate of Andhra Pradesh varies considerably, depending on the geographical region. Summers last from March to June. July to September is the season for tropical rains. About one-third of the total rainfall is brought by the northeast monsoon. October and November see low-pressure systems and tropical cyclones form in the Bay of Bengal which, along with the northeast monsoon, bring rains to the southern and coastal regions of the state.

November, December, January, and February are the winter months in Andhra Pradesh. Since the state has a long coastal belt the winters are not very cold. The range of winter temperature is generally .

Demographics 

According to the Polavaram ordinance bill 2014, 7 mandals of Khammam district in Telangana state merged with Andhra Pradesh to facilitate Polavaram project, due to which population of  added to Andhra Pradesh.

The total population constitute, 70.4% of rural population with  inhabitants and 29.6% of urban population with  inhabitants. Visakhapatnam district has the largest urban population of 47.5% and Srikakulam district with 83.8%, has the largest rural population, among others districts in the state. The population of the state consists 17.1% of Scheduled Caste and 5.3% of Scheduled Tribe population.

There are  male and  female citizens—a sex ratio of 996 females per 1000 males, higher than the national average of 926 per 1000. The literacy rate of the state stands at 67.41%. However, post bifurcation from Telangana, the state is expected to reach 91.1% by 2021. West Godavari district has the highest literacy rate of 74.6% and Vizianagaram district has the least with 58.9%.

Andhra Pradesh ranks tenth of all Indian States in the Human Development Index scores with a score of 0.416. The National Council of Applied Economic Research district analysis in 2001 reveals that Krishna, West Godavari and Chittoor are the three districts in rural AP with the highest Human Development Index scores in ascending order.

Languages 

Telugu is the official language of Andhra Pradesh, which is also the mother tongue of nearly 90% of the population. Rajahmundry is the cultural capital of Andhra Pradesh and Telugu language has roots originated from this region. Urdu is the largest minority language and also the second official language of Andhra Pradesh.

Tamil, Kannada and Odia are also spoken in the border-areas. Lambadi, Koya, Savara, Konda, Gadaba and a number of other languages are spoken by the Scheduled Tribes of the state.

Religion 

The majority of the people in Andhra Pradesh are Hindus while Muslims constitute a sizeable minority. According to the 2011 census, the major religious groups in the state are Hindus (90.89%), Muslims (7.30%) and Christians (1.38%). Buddhists (0.01%), Sikhs (0.02%), Jains (0.05%), others (0.01%) and those who declined to state their religion (0.34%) make up the remaining portion of population.

Hinduism 
Venkateswara Temple at Tirupati is the world's second-richest temple and is visited by millions of devotees throughout the year. Andhra Pradesh is home to Shankaracharya of Pushpagiri Peetham. Other Hindu saints include Sadasiva Brahmendra, Bhaktha Kannappa, Yogi Vemana and Pothuluru Veerabrahmendra.

Mahayana Buddhism 
Buddhism spread to Andhra Pradesh early in its history. The Krishna river valley was "a site of extraordinary Buddhist activity for almost a thousand years." The ancient Buddhist sites in the lower Krishna valley, including Amaravati, Nagarjunakonda and Jaggayyapeta "can be traced to at least the third century BCE, if not earlier."

The region played a central role in the development of Mahayana Buddhism, along with the Magadha-area in northeastern India. A. K. Warder holds that "the Mahāyāna originated in the south of India and almost certainly in the Andhra country." According to Xing, "Several scholars have suggested that the Prajnaparamita probably developed among the Mahasamghikas in Southern India probably in the Andhra country, on the Krishna River." The Prajñāpāramitā Sutras belong to the earliest Mahayana Sutras.

Administrative divisions

Regions 
Andhra Pradesh comprises of three geographic regions Uttara Andhra, Kosta Andhra and Rayalaseema.

Districts 

It has a total of 26 districts, twelve in Coastal Andhra region, six in Uttarandhra and eight in the Rayalaseema region.

Uttara Andhra region :

 Alluri Sitharama Raju  
 Anakapalli
 Parvathipuram Manyam
 Srikakulam
 Visakhapatnam
 Vizianagaram

Kosta Andhra region :

 Bapatla
 Dr. B.R. Ambedkar Konaseema
 East Godavari District with Rajahmundry Headquarters
 Eluru
 Guntur
 Kakinada
 Krishna
 NTR
 Palnadu
 Prakasam
 Sri Potti Sriramulu Nellore
 West Godavari

Rayalaseema region :

 Anantapur
 Annamayya
 Chittoor
 YSR
 Kurnool
 Nandyal
 Sri Sathya Sai 
 Tirupati

Revenue divisions 

These 26 districts are further divided into 77 revenue divisions.

Mandals 

The 77 revenue divisions are in turn divided into 679 mandals.

Cities 
There are a total of 31 cities which include, 16 municipal corporations and 14 municipalities. There are two cities with more than one million inhabitants, namely Visakhapatnam and Vijayawada.

Government and politics 

When the state was first created, Tanguturi Prakasam Pantulu, became the Chief Minister. After the unification with Telangana, Neelam Sanjiva Reddy became the first Chief Minister. He later served as the President of India.

The Indian National Congress (INC), the Praja Socialist Party and the Krishi Lok Party were the major parties in the 1950s. Later the Communist Party of India (CPI) became the dominant opposition party. In the 1967 state assembly elections, all socialist parties were eliminated and the CPI lost opposition party status.

The INC ruled the state from 1956 to 1982. In 1983, the Telugu Desam Party (TDP) won the state elections and N. T. Rama Rao became the Chief Minister of the state for the first time. This broke the long-time single party monopoly enjoyed by the INC. The 1989 elections ended the rule of Rao, with the INC returning to power with Marri Chenna Reddy at the helm. He was replaced by Janardhan Reddy in 1990, who was replaced by Kotla Vijaya Bhaskara Reddy in 1992.

In 1994, Andhra Pradesh gave a mandate to the Telugu Desam Party again, and Rao became the Chief Minister again. Nara Chandrababu Naidu, Rao's son-in-law, came to power in 1995 with the backing of a majority of the MLAs. The Telugu Desam Party won both the assembly and Lok Sabha election in 1999 under the leadership of Chandrababu Naidu. Thus Naidu held the record for the longest-serving Chief Minister (1995 to 2004).

In 2004, Congress returned to power with a new chief ministerial face, YS Rajashekara Reddy, better known as YSR. He also won the 2009 elections, but shortly afterward was killed in a helicopter crash in September of that year. He was succeeded by two other Congressmen, namely Konijeti Rosaiah and Nallari Kiran Kumar Reddy, the last resigning over the impending division of Telangana.

In the last elections held in the unified state in 2014, the TDP got a mandate in their favour in the residuary (new) state. After Telangana became a separate state, N. Chandrababu Naidu, the chief of the TDP became the Chief Minister on 8 June 2014, for the new state of Andhra Pradesh.

As of 2014, the Legislative Assembly of Andhra Pradesh is the lower house of the state with 175 members and the Legislative Council is the upper house with 58 members. In the Parliament of India, Andhra Pradesh has 11 seats in the Rajya Sabha, and 25 seats in the Lok Sabha. There are a total of 175 Assembly constituencies in the state. East Godavari district has the highest number of constituencies with 19 and Vizianagaram district has the least with 9 assembly seats. Whereas, the legislative council of the state has 58 seats, which is one-third of total assembly seats.

In the 2019 elections, YSR's son Y. S. Jaganmohan Reddy of the YSR Congress Party (founded in 2011) became the Chief Minister with a resounding mandate by winning 151 out of 175 seats.

Economy 

Andhra Pradesh was ranked eighth among other Indian states in terms of GSDP for the financial year 2014–2015. In the 2010 list by Forbes magazine, several people from Andhra Pradesh were among the top 100 richest Indians.

Agriculture 

Andhra Pradesh's economy is mainly based on agriculture and livestock. Four important rivers of India, the Godavari, Krishna, Penna, and Tungabhadra flow through the state and provide irrigation. 60 percent of the population is engaged in agriculture and related activities. Rice is the major food crop and staple food of the state. It is an exporter of many agricultural products and is also known as "Rice Bowl of India". The state has three Agricultural Economic Zones in Chittoor district for mango pulp and vegetables, Krishna district for mangoes, Guntur district for chilies.

Besides rice, farmers also grow jowar, bajra, maize, minor millet, coarse grain, many varieties of pulses, oil seeds, sugarcane, cotton, chili pepper, mango nuts and tobacco. Crops used for vegetable oil production such as sunflower and peanuts are popular. There are many multi-state irrigation projects under development, including Godavari River Basin Irrigation Projects and Nagarjuna Sagar Dam.

Livestock and poultry is also another profitable business, which involves rearing cattle in enclosed areas for commercial purposes. The state is also a largest producer of eggs in the country and hence, it is nicknamed as "Egg Bowl of Asia".

Fisheries contribute 10% of total fish and over 70% of the shrimp production of India. The geographical location of the state allows marine fishing as well as inland fish production. The most exported marine exports include Vannamei shrimp

Infrastructure 
Andhra Pradesh is investing in building infrastructure in the state such as highways and making every service of the government digital. National Highway 16 passes through Andhra Pradesh. The highways in the state are also being widened. APSFL is an initiative of the government of Andhra Pradesh to set up an optical fiber network throughout the thirteen districts of Andhra Pradesh. This network provides internet connectivity, telephony and IPTV with fiber to private and corporate users of Andhra Pradesh. The state also has seaports such as Visakhapatnam Port, Kakinada Port, Krishnapatnam Port for import and export and a shipyard for building ships at Visakhapatnam. Major airports in the state are Visakhapatnam, Rajahmundry, Vijayawada, with Visakhapatnam, Tirupati and Vijayawada being international airports.

Industrial sector 

The industrial sector of the state includes some of the key sectors like pharmaceutical, automobile, textiles etc. Sricity located in Chittoor district is an integrated business city which is home to firms including PepsiCo, Isuzu Motors, Cadbury India, Kellogg's, Colgate-Palmolive, Kobelco etc. The PepsiCo firm has its largest plant in India at Sri City. The state is also emerging as destination for the automobile industry which already hosts companies including Ashok Leyland in Krishna district, Hero Motors in Chittoor district, Kia Motors in Anantapur district.

The state is also emerging in information technology and biotechnology. The development of IT in Tier-II and Tier-III cities like Vijayawada, Kakinada and Tirupati is also improving. For the benefit of state, that is, after separating Telangana from Andhra, people of Andhra protested for special status during January in 2017.

Resources 
Andhra Pradesh is one of the storehouses of mineral resources in India. Andhra Pradesh with varied geological formations, contain rich and variety of industrial minerals and building stones.

Andhra Pradesh is listed at the top in the deposit and production of mica in India. Minerals found in the state include limestone, reserves of oil and natural gas, manganese, asbestos, iron ore, ball clay, fire clay, gold diamonds, graphite, dolomite, quartz, tungsten, steatitic, feldspar, silica sand. It has about one-third of India's limestone reserves and is known for large exclusive deposits of barytes and galaxy granite in the international market.

Mining 
Mining is identified as one of the growth engines for the overall development of industry and infrastructure. The Tummalapalle Uranium mine in Andhra has confirmed  of ore and there are indications that it could hold reserves totaling three times its current size.  of metal grade Bauxite deposits in proximity to Visakhapatnam Port.

Discovery of a large quantity of natural gas in KG Basin is expected to provide rapid economic growth.

Power plants 

The state is a pioneer nationwide in solar power generation. APGENCO is the power generating company owned by the state. The state has become power surplus with excess power generation being exported to other states. The state is abundantly endowed with solar power and high head PHES sites to convert the solar power available during the day time in to round the clock power supply. PHES projects also has synergy with the lift irrigation projects in storing water available during the monsoon season and supplying to the uplands throughout the year. Ultimate water and energy requirements of the state can be fully met by the combination of cheap solar power, PHES and irrigation projects economically harnessing renewable energy without much damage to the environment.

Thermal (natural gas and coal based) and renewable power plants totaling to 21,000 MW were installed in the state by 2015. Local power plants of 9,600 MW capacity only are supplying electricity in the state, which includes Simhadri Super Thermal Power Station (2000 MW) of NTPC, Vizag Thermal Power Station (1040 MW), Rayalaseema Thermal Power Station (1650 MW), Sri Damodaram Sanjeevaiah Thermal Power Station (2400 MW), and Narla Tata Rao Thermal Power Plant (1760 MW). Hydel power plants have a capacity of 1671 MW.

Culture 

Andhra Pradesh has rich culture and heritage.

Kuchipudi, the cultural dance recognized as the official dance form of the state of Andhra Pradesh, originated in the village of Kuchipudi in Krishna district. It entered the Guinness World Records for performing Mahabrinda Natyam with a total of 6,117 dancers in Vijayawada.

Andhra Pradesh has thirteen geographical indications in categories of agricultural handicrafts, foodstuff and textiles as per Geographical Indications of Goods (Registration and Protection) Act, 1999. It increased to fifteen with the addition of Banaganapalle Mangoes and Bandar laddu. The other GI tagged goods are, Bobbili Veena, Budithi Bell and Brass Craft, Dharmavaram Handloom Pattu Sarees and Paavadas, Guntur Sannam, Kondapalli Toys, Machilipatnam Kalamkari, Mangalagiri Sarees and Fabrics, Srikalahasti Kalamkari, Tirupati Laddu, Uppada Jamdani Sari and Venkatagiri Sari.

Arts, crafts and artifacts 

Machilipatnam and Srikalahasti Kalamkari are the two unique textile art forms practised in India. There are also other notable handicrafts present in the state, like the soft limestone idol carvings of Durgi. Etikoppaka in Visakhapatnam district is notable for its lac industry, producing lacquered wooden.

The state has many museums, which features a varied collection of ancient sculptures, paintings, idols, weapons, cutlery, and inscriptions, and religious artifacts such as the Amaravati Archaeological Museum, Visakha Museum and Telugu Cultural Museum in Visakhapatnam displays the history of the pre-independence and the Victoria Jubilee Museum in Vijayawada with a large collection of artifacts.

Literature 

Nannayya, Tikkana and Yerrapragada form the trinity who translated the Sanskrit epic Mahabharata into Telugu language. Nannayya wrote the first treatise on Telugu grammar called Andhra Shabda Chintamani in Sanskrit, as there was no grammatical work in Telugu prior to that. Pothana is the poet who composed the classic Srimad Maha Bhagavatamu, a Telugu translation of Sri Bhagavatam. Vemana is notable for his philosophical poems. The Vijayanagara emperor Krishnadevaraya wrote Amuktamalyada. Telugu literature after Kandukuri Veeresalingam is termed as Adhunika Telugu Sahityam (Modern Telugu literature). He is known as Gadya Tikkana and was the author of Telugu social novel, Satyavati Charitam. Jnanpith Award holders from the state include Viswanatha Satyanarayana. The Andhra Pradesh native and revolutionary poet Sri Sri brought new forms of expressionism into Telugu literature.

Media 
The print media in the state consists mainly of Telugu and English newspapers. Eenadu, Sakshi, Andhra Jyothi, and Tel.J.D.Patrika Vaartha all these are Telugu newspapers. English newspapers include Deccan Chronicle and The Hans India.

Art and cinema 

Many composers of Carnatic music like Annamacharya, Kshetrayya, Tyagaraja, and Bhadrachala Ramadas were of Telugu descent. Modern Carnatic music composers and singers like Ghantasala and M. Balamuralikrishna are also of Telugu descent. The Telugu film industry hosts many music composers and playback singers such as S. P. Balasubrahmanyam, P. Susheela, S. Janaki and P. B. Sreenivas. Folk songs are very important and popular in the many rural areas of the state. Forms such as the Burra katha and Poli are still performed today. Harikathaa Kalakshepam (or Harikatha) involves the narration of a story, intermingled with various songs relating to the story. Harikatha was originated in Andhra. Burra katha is an oral storytelling technique with the topic be either a Hindu mythological story or a contemporary social issue. Rangasthalam is an Indian theatre in the Telugu language, based predominantly in Andhra Pradesh. Gurajada Apparao wrote the play Kanyasulkam in 1892, often considered the greatest play in the Telugu language. C. Pullaiah is cited as the father of Telugu theatre movement.

The Telugu film industry is largely based in Hyderabad and Visakhapatnam. The Telugu film culture (also known as "Tollywood") is the second-largest film industry in India next to the Bollywood film industry. Film producer D. Ramanaidu holds a Guinness Record for the most films produced by a person. In the years 2005, 2006 and 2008, the Telugu film industry produced the largest number of films in India, exceeding the number of films produced in Bollywood. The industry holds the Guinness World Record for the largest film production facility in the world.

Cuisine 

Telugu people's traditional sweet Pootharekulu originated from Atreyapuram village of East Godavari district.

Tourism 

The state has several beaches in its coastal districts such as Rushikonda, Mypadu, Suryalanka etc.; caves such as, Borra Caves, Indian rock-cut architecture depicting Undavalli Caves and the country's second longest caves- the Belum Caves. The valleys and hills include, Araku Valley, Horsley Hills, Papi Hills etc. Arma Konda peak located in Visakhapatnam district is the highest peak in Eastern Ghats.

The state is home to various religious pilgrim destinations such as Tirumala Temple, Simhachalam Temple, Annavaram temple, Srisailam temple, Kanaka Durga Temple, Amaravati, Srikalahasti, Shahi Jamia Masjid in Adoni, Gunadala Church in Vijayawada, Buddhist centres at Amaravati, and Nagarjuna Konda, Khadri Lakshmi Narasimha Swamy Temple, Kadiri.

Transport 

The state is well connected to other states through road and rail networks. It is also connected to other countries by means of airways and seaports as well. With a long seacoast along the Bay of Bengal, it also has many ports for sea trade. The state has one of the largest railway junctions at Vijayawada and one of the largest seaports at Visakhapatnam.

Roads 

It also forms part of AH 45 which comes under the Asian Highway Network.

The state government owned Andhra Pradesh State Road Transport Corporation (APSRTC) is the major public bus transport, which runs thousands of buses connecting different parts of the state. Pandit Nehru Bus Station (PNBS) in Vijayawada is one of the largest bus terminals in Asia. From 30 January 2019, all the vehicles in the state are registered as AP–39, followed by an alphabet and four digits.

Railways 

The rail density of the state is 16.59 per , compared to an all India average of 20. The Howrah–Chennai main line which runs through the state is proposed to be upgraded into a high-speed rail corridor through the Diamond Quadrilateral project of the Indian Railways.

The railway network spans two zones, further subdivided into divisions – Vijayawada, Guntur and Guntakal railway divisions of South Central Railway zone, and Waltair railway division of East Coast Railway zone. There is a demand for creating a unified zone for the state based out of Visakhapatnam.

There are three A1 and twenty-three A-category railway stations in the state.  has been declared the cleanest railway station in the country. The railway station of Shimiliguda was the first highest broad gauge railway station in the country.

As on date the Railways lines in Andhra Pradesh are under the following Railway zones/Divisions
 South Central Railway-Secunderabad Division
 South Central Railway-Hyderabad Division
 South Central Railway-Vijayawada Division
 South Central Railway-Guntakal Division
 South Central Railway-Guntur Division
 East Coast Railway- Waltair Division
 East Coast Railway- Khurda Road Division

A new railway zone South Coast Railway Zone (SCoR) has been announced as the newest railway zone of the Indian Railways and is headquartered at Visakhapatnam, Andhra Pradesh. The formal notification for operationalization of this Zone is yet to be issued. When created it will include Waltair Division of East Coast Railway zone and Vijayawada Division, 
Guntakal Division & Guntur Division of South Central Railway zone.

Airports 

Visakhapatnam Airport is the only airport in the state with operating international flights while Vijayawada Airport at Gannavaram has launched an international flight to Singapore, recently. The state has four other domestic airports, Rajahmundry Airport, Kadapa Airport, Kurnool Airport a privately owned, public use airport at Puttaparthi, and Tirupati Airport located in the city of Tirupati. There are also 16 small airstrips located in the state.

Sea ports 

Andhra Pradesh has one of the country's largest port at Visakhapatnam in terms of cargo handling. The other famous ports are Krishnapatnam Port (Nellore), Gangavaram Port and Kakinada Port. Gangavaram Port is a deep seaport which can accommodate ocean liners up to 200,000–250,000 DWT. There are 14 notified non-major ports at Bheemunipatnam, S.Yanam, Machilipatnam, Nizampatnam, and Vadarevu.

Education and research 

Andhra Pradesh has an overall literacy rate of 67.41% as per the 2011 Indian census. The primary and secondary school education is imparted by government, aided and private schools, managed and regulated by the School Education Department of the state. There are urban, rural and residential schools. As per the child info and school information report (2018–19), there were a total of  students, enrolled in  schools respectively. The Directorate of Government Examinations of the state administers and conduct the Secondary School Certificate (SSC) examination. More than  students have appeared for the 2019 SSC exam and recorded an overall pass percentage of 94.88% with a 100% pass percentage in 5,464 schools. The mediums of instruction are primarily Telugu and English with a very few opting for Urdu, Hindi, Kannada, Odia and Tamil.

Higher education in the state is administered by the Department of Higher Education. The central universities are All India Institute of Medical Sciences, IIM Visakhapatnam, IIT Tirupati, NIT Tadepalligudem, IIITDM Kurnool, Indian Institute of Petroleum and Energy, NIDV, Central University of Andhra Pradesh, IIIT Sri City, IISER Tirupati, Agriculture University, Guntur and IIFT Kakinada. The Government of Andhra Pradesh established Rajiv Gandhi University of Knowledge Technologies (RGUKT) in 2008 to cater to the education needs of the rural youth of Andhra Pradesh. As per the University Grants Commission, Sri Sathya Sai Institute of Higher Learning, GITAM, KL University and Vignan University, MBU University are the Deemed Universities in the state. There are 18 state universities in the districts providing higher education in horticulture, law, medical, technology, Vedic and veterinary. Andhra University is the oldest of the universities in the state, established in 1926.

Research 

Research institutes have been set up by the central state government. Naval Science and Technological Laboratory (NSTL), National Institute of Oceanography, Visakhapatnam (NIO), School of Planning and Architecture at Vijayawada is an autonomous research institute under Ministry of Human Resource Development of Government of India, National Atmospheric Research Laboratory carry out fundamental and applied research in atmospheric and space sciences, Indian Institute of Science Education and Research, Tirupati, Society for Applied Microwave Electronics Engineering and Research, Visakhapatnam Central Tobacco Research Institute, Rajahmundry under control of ICAR (Indian Council of Agriculture Research) conducts fundamental and applied research on tobacco for the benefit of the farming community, Indian Institute of Oil Palm Research (IIOPR) at Pedavegi near Eluru in West Godavari district serves as a centre for conducting and co-ordinating research on all aspects of oil palm conservation, improvement, production, protection, post-harvest technology and transfer of technology, CCRH Regional Research Institute at Gudivada, Clinical Research Institute at Tirupati and National Institute of Oceanography at Visakhapatnam are some of them. Agriculture Research Institute (Acharya NG Ranga Agriculture University) KADIRI.

Space research organisation 

Satish Dhawan Space Centre, also known as Sriharikota Range (SHAR), at barrier island of Sriharikota in Tirupati district is a satellite launching station operated by Indian Space Research Organisation. It is India's primary orbital launch site. India's lunar orbiter Chandrayaan-1 was launched from the centre at 6:22 AM IST on 22 October 2008.

Sports 

The Sports Authority of Andhra Pradesh is the governing body which looks after the infrastructure development in cricket, field hockey, association football, skating, Olympic weightlifting, chess, water sports, tennis, badminton, table tennis, cycling, etc.

Cricket is one of the most popular sports in the state. The ACA-VDCA Stadium in Visakhapatnam is the home to Andhra Pradesh cricket team. The venue regularly hosts international as well as domestic matches. Notable cricketers from Andhra Pradesh include former Indian captain Mohammad Azharuddin, Maharajkumar of Vizianagram, M. V. Narasimha Rao, M. S. K. Prasad, VVS Laxman, Tirumalasetti Suman, Arshad Ayub, Ambati Rayudu, Venkatapathy Raju, Sravanthi Naidu, Yalaka Venugopal Rao, Hanuma Vihari and Srikar Bharat.

Humpy Koneru, from Gudivada in Krishna district, is an Indian chess Grandmaster.
Dandamudi Rajagopal Rao, the first 12 times National heavy weight lifting Champion, hails from krishna district. 
Karnam Malleswari, the first female Indian to win an Olympic medal, hails from Srikakulam district.

Krishnam Raju Gadiraju of Bhimavaram, is a four-time world record holder. He is a speedsolver and unicyclist.

Pullela Gopichand is a former Indian badminton player. He won the All England Open Badminton Championships in 2001, becoming the second Indian to win after Prakash Padukone.
Srikanth Kidambi, a badminton player, is the first ever Indian to reach the World Championships final in 2021 in the men's singles and win a silver medal.

Cherukuri Lenin (1985 or 198624 October 2010) was an Indian archer and coach who won a silver medal at the Asian Grand Prix in Malaysia and was a national archery coach.

See also 
 List of people from Andhra Pradesh
Outline of Andhra Pradesh
 Middle kingdoms of India
 Part One of the Constitution of India

Notes

References

External links

Government
 Andhra Pradesh Government Website 
 Department of Tourism

General information
 
 

 
.
States and union territories of India
States and territories established in 1956
1956 establishments in India